The Attoyac River is a river in eastern Texas. It flows through Nacogdoches, San Augustine, 	
Shelby and Rusk counties of east Texas. It is a tributary to the Angelina River which it enters within the Sam Rayburn Reservoir.

See also
List of rivers of Texas

References

USGS Hydrologic Unit Map - State of Texas (1974)

Rivers of Texas